WBSS (1490 AM), is a 400-watt radio station operating with a sports betting talk format, licensed to Pleasantville, New Jersey. This station  is under ownership of Longport Media and it serves three counties in New Jersey: Ocean, Atlantic and Cape May. Along the Garden State Parkway the station can be heard clearly from Exit 74 to Exit 10.

History
The first station to broadcast on the 1490 frequency at the South Jersey shore was WBAB in Atlantic City, which operated as a CBS affiliate in the 1940s. WBAB went off the air and by 1955 had been replaced by WLDB (named for its owners, Leroy and Dorothy Bremmer). By the early 1970s WLDB was an NBC affiliate playing mostly country music.

In late 1974 WLDB was sold to a group of local African-American businessmen. The call sign was changed to WUSS ("We're The United States of Soul!") and the station began to target the black community with its programming. During its 20-year run as an Urban station, some of the WUSS personalities included Larry Hicks, Larry Hayes, Lee "Brown Sugar" Sherman, Ron Allen, Eddie O'Jay, Stan Brooks, Cooks Books, Jimmy Mack, Robert G Money, Kingsley Smith, Ellis B. "Bruce Ellis" Feaster, Steve Ross, with The Dude & The Dudess, Vernon Robbins, Cleo Rowe, and William K. Fisher Jr. WUSS was successful for a number of years under the name "1490 jAMs", but eventually fell victim to the general trend away from music on AM. After a short period of running satellite-delivered talk and oldies/blues programming, it went silent in the mid-1990s, then was sold to the owners of WOND.

The new ownership changed the station's city of license to Pleasantville and relocated its transmitter to the WOND site in that city. The call letters were changed to WGYM and a sports talk format was instituted. In 2001 the WUSS call sign returned and the format was changed to gospel; in the next few years, the station tried playing R&B oldies, then pop oldies (simulcasting WTKU), went back to sports talk, then began simulcasting WTKU again (taking on the WTKU call letters in 2006). In the spring of 2007, the call sign was changed to WTAA and the station began to run a progressive talk radio format, mostly fed from the Air America Radio network. It also carried Imus In The Morning.

On October 9, 2008, the talk format was abandoned in favor of Bustos Media's satellite-driven regional Mexican format.  The following February, WTAA again changed its format to tropical music, simulcast from WBON in Westhampton, New York.  The callsign changed to WBSS in January 2010.

On August 12, 2011, the station switched to a simulcast of WOND.  The station changed once more on September 30, 2011, when WBSS began to simulcast Philadelphia sports radio station WIP-FM, branded as "WIP at the Beach".

WBSS went off the air at the time of Hurricane Sandy. By late February 2013 it had resumed broadcasting. The station broadcast WOND, until April 3, 2013, the station returned to a simulcast of WTKU.

On August 5, 2019, WBSS became one of the first terrestrial radio stations in the country dedicated entirely to sports betting, teaming up with The BetR Network, as the station re-branded as "Sports Betting Radio."

References

External links 
1490 Sports Betting Radio website

BSS (AM)
Sports radio stations in the United States
Radio stations established in 1955
1955 establishments in New Jersey